Justice Perry may refer to:

Antonio Perry, associate justice of the Hawaii Territorial Supreme Court
James E. C. Perry, associate justice of the Florida Supreme Court
John C. Perry, appointed chief justice of the Supreme Court of Wyoming Territory who died before assuming office
Melissa Perry, associate justice of the Federal Court of Australia
Sion L. Perry, associate justice of the Alabama Supreme Court
Thomas Erskine Perry, chief justice of the supreme court in Bombay during the British rule of India
William C. Perry, associate justice of the Oregon Supreme Court

See also
Judge Perry (disambiguation)